The 2016 ITF Women's Circuit UBS Thurgau was a professional tennis tournament played on indoor carpet courts. It was the fourth edition of the tournament and part of the 2016 ITF Women's Circuit, offering a total of $50,000 in prize money. It took place in Kreuzlingen, Switzerland, on 22–28 February 2016.

Singles main-draw entrants

Seeds 

 1 Rankings as of 15 February 2016.

Other entrants 
The following players received wildcards into the singles main draw:
  Kathinka von Deichmann
  Xenia Knoll
  Rebeka Masarova
  Nina Stadler

The following players received entry from the qualifying draw:
  Gioia Barbieri
  Cristiana Ferrando
  Rebecca Šramková
  Anna Zaja

The following player received entry by a protected ranking:
  Claire Feuerstein

The following player received entry by a junior exempt:
  Dalma Gálfi

Champions

Singles

 Kristýna Plíšková def.  Amra Sadiković, 7–6(7–4), 7–6(7–3)

Doubles

 Antonia Lottner /  Amra Sadiković def.  Tena Lukas /  Bernarda Pera, 5–7, 6–2, [10–5]

External links 
 2016 ITF Women's Circuit UBS Thurgau at ITFtennis.com
 Official website 

2016 ITF Women's Circuit
2016 in Swiss women's sport
Tennis tournaments in Switzerland
Lugano